Charaxes plateni is a butterfly in the family Nymphalidae. It was described by Otto Staudinger in 1889. It is endemic to Palawan in the Indomalayan realm.

Charaxes plateni is a large butterfly with copper and brown upper sides. The forewings are very concave with a very broad brown marginal band which, at the hind wings, thins and occupies only 2/3 of the wing (it is absent from the basal third). The hindwings are adorned with a submarginal line of brown spots pupillated with white. The underside is beige with clearly visible dark veins.

References

External links
Charaxes Ochsenheimer, 1816 at Markku Savela's Lepidoptera and Some Other Life Forms

plateni
Butterflies described in 1889